Abrosovo is the name of several rural localities in Russia:
Abrosovo, Ivanovo Oblast, a village in Verkhnelandekhovsky District of Ivanovo Oblast
Abrosovo, Novgorod Oblast, a village in Pestovsky District of Novgorod Oblast
Abrosovo, Pskov Oblast, a village in Pskovsky District of Pskov Oblast
Abrosovo, Vladimir Oblast, a village in Petushinsky District of Vladimir Oblast